KRCQ (102.3 FM, "Real Country 102") is a radio station broadcasting a classic country music format. The station is licensed to serve Detroit Lakes, Minnesota, United States.  The station is currently owned by Leighton Broadcasting.

Ownership History

In October 2009, Detroit Lakes Broadcasting filed an application with the FCC to transfer the broadcast license to Lake Lida Broadcasting, LLC. This application was approved on January 8, 2010, and the transfer of the sale went through.  In June 2010, the station was bought from Lake Lida Broadcasting, and joined the Leighton Broadcasting group.

Programming

6am – 9am	Real Early with Dave Lee
9am-10am	All Request 9 o' Clock Work Block w/ Dave Lee
10am-12pm	Smokey Rivers
12pm-1pm	David Kinderman
1pm-3pm	        Mark Phillips
3pm-6pm	        David Kinderman
6p-12am	        Trapper John

References

External links
KRCQ official website

Classic country radio stations in the United States
Radio stations in Minnesota
Radio stations established in 1972
Becker County, Minnesota